Plessis is a hamlet and census-designated place in the town of Alexandria in Jefferson County, New York, United States. Its population was 164 as of the 2010 census. Plessis had a post office from September 16, 1823, until March 26, 2011; it still has its own ZIP code, 13675. New York State Route 26 passes through the community.

Geography

Demographics

References

Hamlets in Jefferson County, New York
Hamlets in New York (state)
Census-designated places in Jefferson County, New York
Census-designated places in New York (state)